Fontana is a city in San Bernardino County, California, United States. Founded by Azariel Blanchard Miller in 1913, it remained essentially rural until World War II, when entrepreneur Henry J. Kaiser built a large steel mill in the area. It is now a regional hub of the trucking industry, with the east–west Interstate 10 and State Route 210 crossing the city and Interstate 15 passing diagonally through its northwestern quadrant. The city is about 46 miles east of Los Angeles.

It is home to a renovated historic theater, a municipal park, and the Auto Club Speedway, which is on the site of the old Kaiser Steel Mill just outside the city. Fontana also hosts the Fontana Days Half Marathon and 5K run. This race is the fastest half-marathon course in the world.

The United States Census Bureau reported that Fontana's 2020 population was 212,704, making it the second-most-populous city in San Bernardino County and the 21st largest in the state.

History

Fontana was founded in 1919 by Azariel Blanchard Miller. The name fontana is Italian for fountain or water source, being in close proximity to the Santa Ana River to the east. Within a few years it became an agricultural town of citrus orchards, vineyards and chicken ranches and astride U.S. Route 66 (now known as Foothill Boulevard). The Fontana area was radically transformed during World War II when Henry J. Kaiser built the Kaiser Steel plant, at the time one of only two steel mills west of the Mississippi River outside the city limits. To provide for the plant workers' health needs, Henry J. Kaiser constructed the Fontana Kaiser Permanente medical facility, now the largest managed care organization in the United States.

In the 1950s and 1960s, Fontana was home to a drag racing strip that was a venue in the NHRA circuit. Mickey Thompson's Fontana International Dragway was also referred to as Fontana Drag City or Fontana Drag Strip. The original Fontana strip is gone, but the owners of NASCAR's new Auto Club Speedway opened a NHRA-sanctioned drag strip just oustside Fontana in mid-2006.

Ro-Val's automobile museum, located on Foothill Boulevard on the western outskirts between Fontana and Cucamonga, was the home for many classic automobiles of the 1920s and 1930s, including a huge vehicle once owned by screen actor Fatty Arbuckle. When the Ro-Val museum closed, the vehicles were sold to Bill Harrah, a Nevada casino owner and automobile collector, who placed them on display in the museum located at his casino.

In 2000, the city had a total population of 128,929; by 2020 the city had 212,704 residents.  This rapid growth has had much to do with the numerous large, new residential developments in the sparsely populated northern part of the city, as well as with the city's aggressive (and highly successful) campaign to annex several unincorporated, but developed, San Bernardino County areas in 2006–2007.

Environmental issues
In 2019 the California Air Resources Board advised the City against housing people within 1,000 feet of industrial warehouses because of harmful truck pollution. The city was also sued by San Bernardino County, the Center for Biological Diversity, the Sierra Club and the Center for Community Action and Environmental Justice over the approval of West Valley Logistics Center for violating state environmental laws.

In 2021, the City was sued by the State of California Attorney General's office for violation of the California Environmental Quality Act by encouraging warehouse development in low-income areas.

2021 city manager pay criticism

In 2021, city leadership was criticized by the California State Controller’s Office for paying former city manager Ken Hunt $932,623 in 2020 though he hadn't worked a single day. The city mayor and city council declined to explain why such compensation was warranted for a city manager who hadn't worked in the city since 2019. The city council also failed to follow the Brown Act, which requires public agencies to specifically list closed-session items for terminations.

Geography

Topography
Most of the city of Fontana, like its eastern neighbors Rialto and San Bernardino, is built atop a geologically young, gently southward-sloping alluvial fan from nearby Lytle Creek, deposited mainly during the Holocene and late-Pleistocene epochs. There are also sedimentary deposits of similar age from Etiwanda Creek on the western edge of the city. However, the northern and southern edges of the city are formed by the much older San Gabriel and Jurupa mountain ranges, respectively. The Jurupa Mountains are composed primarily of Cretaceous and Paleozoic-era rocks, as are the San Gabriels, which also include even older, Proterozoic formations. The most prominent of the San Gabriel Mountains visible from Fontana is Cucamonga Peak, elevation . Additionally, the Cucamonga Fault Zone, contiguous with the Sierra Madre Fault Zone, runs through the northern part of the city, along the base of the San Gabriels, notably through the Hunter's Ridge and Coyote Canyon planned communities. It is estimated to be capable of producing earthquakes approximately of magnitude 6.0-7.0.

This difference in elevation is due to the southward slope of the Lytle Creek alluvial fan.

Climate
The city is frequently affected by the strong, hot and dry Santa Ana winds as they blow through the nearby Cajon Pass of the San Gabriel Mountains, from the Mojave Desert.

Demographics

2010
The 2010 United States Census reported that Fontana had a population of 196,069. The racial makeup of Fontana was 92,978 (47.4%) White (15.4% Non-Hispanic White), 19,574 (10.0%) African American, 1,957 (1.0%) Native American, 12,948 (6.6%) Asian, 547 (0.3%) Pacific Islander, 58,449 (29.8%) from other races, and 9,616 (4.9%) from two or more races. There were 130,957 people of Hispanic or Latino origin, of any race (66.8%).

The Census reported that 195,625 people (99.8% of the population) lived in households, 216 (0.1%) lived in non-institutionalized group quarters, and 228 (0.1%) were institutionalized.

There were 49,116 households, out of which 29,465 (60.0%) had children under the age of 18 living in them, 30,245 (61.6%) were opposite-sex married couples living together, 8,074 (16.4%) had a female householder with no husband present, 4,125 (8.4%) had a male householder with no wife present. There were 3,447 (7.0%) unmarried opposite-sex partnerships, and 317 (0.6%) same-sex married couples or partnerships. 4,801 households (9.8%) were made up of individuals, and 1,633 (3.3%) had someone living alone who was 65 years of age or older. The average household size was 3.98. There were 42,444 families (86.4% of all households); the average family size was 4.18.

In the city, 64,521 people (32.9%) were under the age of 18, 22,995 people (11.7%) aged 18 to 24, 57,646 people (29.4%) aged 25 to 44, 39,823 people (20.3%) aged 45 to 64, and 11,084 people (5.7%) were 65 years of age or older. The median age was 28.7 years. For every 100 females, there were 98.7 males. For every 100 females age 18 and over, there were 95.7 males.

The homeowner vacancy rate was 2.6%; the rental vacancy rate was 6.0%. 134,857 people (68.8% of the population) lived in owner-occupied housing units and 60,768 people (31.0%) lived in rental housing units.

According to the 2010 United States Census, Fontana had a median household income of $64,195, with 15.0% of the population living below the federal poverty line.

2000
As of the census of 2000, there were 128,929 people, 34,014 households, and 29,013 families residing in the city. The population density was 3,569.7 inhabitants per square mile (1,378.2/km2). The racial makeup of the city was 45.0% White, 11.8% African American, 1.1% Native American, 4.4% Asian, 0.3% Pacific Islander, 31.9% from other races, and 5.4% from two or more races. Hispanic or Latino residents of any race were 57.7% of the population.

There were 34,014 households, out of which 57.6% had children under the age of 18 living with them, 62.5% were married couples living together, 15.5% had a female householder with no husband present, and 14.7% were non-families. 10.9% of all households were made up of individuals, and 3.6% had someone living alone who was 65 years of age or older. The average household size was 3.8 and the average family size was 4.0.

In the city, 37.8% of the population was under the age of 18, 10.3% was from 18 to 24, 32.4% from 25 to 44, 14.7% from 45 to 64, and 4.7% was 65 years of age or older. The median age was 26 years. For every 100 females, there were 98.5 males. For every 100 females age 18 and over, there were 95.2 males.

The median income for a household in the city was $45,782, and the median income for a family was $46,957. Males had a median income of $36,062 versus $26,305 for females. The per capita income for the city was $14,208. About 12.2% of families and 14.7% of the population were below the poverty line, including 18.2% of those under age 18 and 10.3% of those age 65 or over.

Economy
Fontana's current economy is driven largely by industrial uses, particularly trucking-based industries. Public funding assists in reducing the associated pollution impacts the community.

According to the city's 2021 Comprehensive Annual Financial Report, the top employers in the city are:

The Auto Club Speedway brings racing fans and dozens of teams to the region each year, bringing economic activity to the area's restaurants, motels, and hotels.

Arts and culture

Center Stage
Located next door to the Lewis Library on Sierra stands the Center Stage Theater. Built in the Art Deco style in 1937, and designed by architect C.H. Boller, the former Fontana (movie) Theater was recently renovated during 2004–2008 after several decades of various other uses, into a live dinner theater, with $6,000,000 in funds earmarked by the Fontana City Council. It reopened to the public on July 25, 2008.

Steelworkers' Auditorium
Next door to the Lewis Library and Technology Center, the Steelworkers' Auditorium houses events like Performance Tuesdays, theatre camps, acting classes, musical classes, summer reading programs, family movie nights, performance recitals and dance classes.

The building is also available for rent for certain occasions such as: award ceremonies, dance recitals, talent competitions and much more.

Art Depot
The Art Depot is one of Fontana's original community centers, and is a specialized Cultural Arts facility. Originally built as a freight depot of the Pacific Electric Railway in 1915, the Art Depot sits alongside the newly landscaped Pacific Electric Trail in the Helen Putnam Historical Plaza. The Art Depot offers art classes, open studio activities, and special events.

Artist Showcase
Through the provision of quarterly artist showcases, Fontana residents are introduced to local artists.

One of the objectives of the program is to introduce the process used by the artist to develop the art form, and methods used to bring the work to life. Each artist selected for the quarterly showcases is asked to exhibit their work for a three-month period in the City Council Chamber Foyer located at City Hall. The artist will also be showcased in a small presentation, invited to dine with the members of the Fontana Community and presented to City Council. Additionally, each artist selected will be awarded a nominal stipend from the local Fontana business community.

Auto Club Speedway

Auto Club Speedway, a racetrack that plays host to the NASCAR Cup Series and Xfinity Series, along with former IndyCar Series events. It is located in an unincorporated area just outside of Fontana. It is built on the former site of the Kaiser Steel mill. The large smelting furnaces of the mill were sold to China, and the rest remains a working steel mill operated by California Steel Industries, which is owned by the Japanese company JFE Steel Corporation. The track is currently a low-banked 2-mile oval, but will be terraformed into a 0.5 mile long short track that is similar in style to the Bristol Motor Speedway by 2023 due to the COVID-19 pandemic forcing it to be pushed back a year.

Lewis Library

The Lewis Library and Technology Center, opened in 2008 at an estimated cost of over $60,000,000, is the largest library in the San Bernardino County Library System.

Parks and recreation
Also referred to simply as Jurupa Hills Regional Park, this is a  multi-use park at the northeastern end of Mount Jurupa. The park includes the Mary Vagle Museum & Nature Center, the Martin Tudor Splash Park, and a  ancient Native American historic site.

Community centers

Cypress Neighborhood Center
The Center opened its doors in the heart of downtown Fontana for over 30 years. Since then, it has undergone some renovations and changed some of its programming. It is a center devoted to bringing forth as many fun and unique programs to residents. The programming includes ballet, dance, karate, kickboxing, a Tiny Tot program, and much more.

Don Day Neighborhood Center
The Don Day Neighborhood Center is a community recreation center located in South Fontana. Attached to the center is an outside pool that is only opened for the summer. They have open rooms used for programs like mixed martial arts, dance, fitness, gymnastics, and much more. The rooms are also available for birthday parties, meetings, and other celebrations. There is a Tiny Tot Program affiliated with the center as well.

The center is also combined with Southridge Park that features amenities such as tennis courts, basketball courts, mountain bike trails, baseball fields, playgrounds, and open spaces.

Jessie Turner Health and Fitness Community Center, Aquatics Center and Fontana Park
Upon opening to the public on October 25, 2008, Fontana Park (located in the northern part of the city at Summit Avenue and Lytle Creek Road), is now the city's second largest municipal park, featuring a large community center (Jessie Turner Health and Fitness Community Center), aquatic center, skate park, dog park, basketball gym, sports pavilion, and several child-oriented play areas.

Government

Local government
Fontana is a general law city; it has no city charter. Led by a council composed of a mayor and four councilmembers, it uses a council-manager form of government. The mayor, council members, city clerk, and city treasurer are elected at-large to serve four-year terms.

According to the city's most recent Comprehensive Annual Financial Report, the city's various funds had $348.0 million in Revenues, $224.0 million in expenditures, $1,371.6 million in total assets, $754.1 million in total liabilities, and $251.3 million in cash and investments.

State and federal representation

Education

Public schools
While most residents of the city attend schools within the Fontana Unified School District, some areas of the city are served by neighboring school districts.

 The northwest area of the city is partly served by the Etiwanda School District (K thru 8 only) and the Chaffey Joint Union High School District (high schools only).
 The southeast area of the city is partly served by the Colton Joint Unified School District.
 The northeast area of the city is partly served by the Rialto Unified School District.

Charter schools
There are two options for youth charter schools in Fontana. These schools are chartered through the Victor Valley Union High School District and offer an independent study program and small group classes to obtain a high school diploma.

Infrastructure

Transportation

The Metrolink rail service to the greater Los Angeles area has a station here and runs through the center of town. The city of Fontana is ten minutes away from Ontario International Airport.

The city is also served by Omnitrans bus service. and VVTA.
Private transportation operators that serve the city of Fontana include FuturaNet, El Corre Caminos, TUFESA, Los Limosines,  and Santiago Express which serve the predominately the Hispanic community seeking transportation to Tijuana, Gomez Palacio, Las Vegas and El Paso.

 San Bernardino Freeway
 Ontario Freeway
 Foothill Boulevard (Historic U.S. Route 66)
 Valley Boulevard (Historic U.S. Route 99)
 Foothill Freeway

Utilities
Fontana receives electrical power through Southern California Edison. Gas service is provided by the Southern California Gas Company. Telephone and DSL Internet service are through AT&T and Frontier Communications, though Frontier serves a smaller portion of the city. Charter Communications also provides cable television and cable Internet access. Burrtec Waste provides rubbish and trash collection throughout the city. Burrtec offers both regular waste and green waste recycling programs. Fontana is served by five different water companies, but none of their service areas overlap. These companies are: Fontana Water; the Cucamonga Valley Water District; Marygold Mutual Water; and West Valley Water District, and the city of Rialto. Sewage service in the city is provided by the Inland Empire Utilities Agency, but is billed out by the city of Fontana itself.  The Fontana community is serviced by KFON-TV (commonly known as Fontana Community Television), a Government-access television (GATV) station.

Healthcare
Fontana is home to the Kaiser Permanente-Fontana Hospital. Located on Sierra Avenue, and occupying most of the block between Sierra, Marygold, and Palmetto Avenues, and Valley Boulevard, The campus is one of the largest healthcare facilities in the Inland Empire Region. The various facilities are also among the tallest and largest buildings in the city (other than industrial distribution centers).
The hospital is home to sixty different specialized departments, plus emergency care.

Also, located in the north end of the city, along the "Miracle Mile" of Sierra Lakes Parkway and the 210 freeway, is the Sierra San Antonio Medical Plaza, a  outpatient center and medical office building supported by San Antonio Community Hospital. Services currently available from SSAMP are urgent care, diagnostic radiology, physician offices, and a pharmacy.
The facility also boasts a  educational suite where community lectures, health screenings, awareness campaigns, maternity and CPR classes are held.

Law enforcement
The Fontana Police Department employs 207 sworn officers, as well as civilian personnel. The department was established in October 1952.

Notable people
 Hit-Boy, music producer, recording artist
 Travis Barker, musician
 Tyler Chatwood, pitcher for Colorado Rockies of Major League Baseball
 Jesse Chavez, MLB player for the Los Angeles Angels
 Chukwudi Chijindu, soccer player
 Greg Colbrunn, former MLB player, World Series champion
Jermaine Curtis, MLB player
 Mike Davis, author and commentator
 Adam Driver, actor
 Maurice Edu, former soccer player and currently the color commentator for Atlanta United TV broadcast
 Bill Fagerbakke, television and voice actor, SpongeBob SquarePants
 Sammy Hagar, rock musician (guitarist and vocalist), former member of Montrose and Van Halen
 Alan Harper, pro football player
 Marvin Jones, NFL wide receiver, Cincinnati Bengals
 Sharon Jordan, film and television actress, The Suite Life of Zack & Cody
 Scott Karl, MLB player for Milwaukee Brewers, Colorado Rockies, and Anaheim Angels
 Sam Khalifa, former MLB player
 Bobby Kielty, former MLB player for Oakland Athletics and Boston Red Sox
 Jeff Liefer, former MLB player for Chicago White Sox
 Whitman Mayo, actor (Sanford and Son), lived in Fontana and was once Grand Marshal of the Fontana Days Parade
 Troy Percival, former relief pitcher for 2002 World Series champion Anaheim Angels and Tampa Bay Rays
 Michael Pitre, running backs coach for the Atlanta Falcons
 Melissa Ricks, Filipino-American actress, dancer, model and TV host, Star Circle Quest contestant and alumni.
 Leo Romero, professional skateboarder
 Sean Rooks, NBA basketball player (retired)
 Brett Rossi, glamour model, entertainer, dancer and pornographic film actress
 Alexis Serna, placekicker for Winnipeg Blue Bombers (CFL)
 Jimmy Smith, cornerback for Baltimore Ravens
 Chris Stewart, MLB catcher for Pittsburgh Pirates and New York Yankees
 Eric Weddle, NFL defensive back 
 Jamaal Williams, NFL running back for Detroit Lions
 Marc Wilmore ( 1963 – 2021) American television writer, producer, actor, and comedian.
 Charlyne Yi, actress and comedian
 Mia Yim, pro wrestler

In popular culture
The Hells Angels Motorcycle Club was founded in Fontana, in 1948. The founding charter is known as the Berdoo Charter, in reference to the slang name for San Bernardino.

See also

U.S. Rabbit Experimental Station  California Historical Landmark in Fontana.
San Bernardino County Sheriff's Department
List of U.S. cities with large Hispanic populations

References

External links

 

 
Cities in San Bernardino County, California
Populated places in San Bernardino County, California
Incorporated cities and towns in California
Populated places established in 1919
1919 establishments in California
Chicano and Mexican neighborhoods in California